

Classification 

The winning roster of Olimpija:
  Boris Kristančič
  Janez Bajc
  Janko Šolmajer
  Karel Povž
  Marko Vrhovec
  Igor Jelnikar
  Miha Lokar
  Marjan Kandus
  Matija Dermastija
  Emil Logar
  Karel Kapelj
  Ivo Daneu
  Peter Kralj
  Primož Brišnik

Coach:  Boris Kristančič

Qualification in 1959-60 season European competitions 

FIBA European Champions Cup
 Olimpija (champions)

References

Yugoslav First Basketball League seasons